Maksims Bogdanovs (born January 2, 1989) is a Latvian motorcycle speedway rider, since 2007 participating in Speedway Grand Prix of Latvia competitions.

Speedway Grand Prix results

Honours

World Championships 

 Individual World Championship (Speedway Grand Prix)
 2007 - 31st place (2 points in one event)
 2008 - 33rd place (0 points in one event)
 Team World Championship (Speedway World Cup)
 2006 - 4th place in Qualifying round 1
 2007 - 3rd place in Qualifying round 1
 2009 - 2nd place in Qualifying round 2
 Individual U-21 World Championship
 2007 - 12th place in Semi-Final 2
 2008 - 16th place in Semi-Final 2
 2009 - 15th place in Semi-Final 1

European Championships 

 Individual European Championship
 2008 - injury before the Final (6th place in Semi-Final 3)
 Individual U-19 European Championship
 2005 -  Mšeno - 17th place (1 point)
 2007 -  Częstochowa - 12th place (6 points)
 2008 - 6th place in Semi-Final 1
 Team U-19 European Championship
 2008 - 3rd place in Semi-Final 2
 European Club Champions' Cup
 2007 - 2nd place in Semi-Final 2
 2008 -  Slaný - 4th place (4 points)

See also 
 Russia national speedway team
 List of Speedway Grand Prix riders

References

External links 
 (ru) Riders of Lokomotive Daugavpils
 (ru)Riders of Lokomotive Daugavpils 2010

1989 births
Living people
Latvian speedway riders